Yauheni Bahutski (born 7 September 1999 in Minsk Region) is a Belarusian discus thrower.

His personal best is 66.03 m, set at Regional Sport Complex, Brest, Belarus on 29 April 2021, which qualified him for the 2020 Olympic Games. He won the discus throw at the 2021 European Throwing Cup in Split in 2021 with the Championship record.

He finished second at the 2018 IAAF World U20 Championships.

References

External links
World Athletics profile

1999 births
Living people
Belarusian male discus throwers
Athletes (track and field) at the 2020 Summer Olympics
Olympic athletes of Belarus
Sportspeople from Minsk Region